The Basic Competence Test for Junior High School Students is a standardized exam for junior high school students in Taiwan. It is also referred to as the "junior group test" and "group test". Test scores are used for enrollment in high school.

See also
 Education in Taiwan

References

External links
Basic Competence

Education in Taiwan
Standardized tests